15-Minute Hamlet is a 1976 comedic abridgement of William Shakespeare's Hamlet, written by Tom Stoppard.

The play, an excerpt from Dogg's Hamlet, condenses the original Hamlet, including all the best-known scenes, into approximately 13 minutes of on-stage action. This is followed by another even more drastically reduced performance of the play from beginning to end, lasting 2 minutes, bringing the total running time up to 15 minutes.

References

Plays and musicals based on Hamlet
Plays by Tom Stoppard
Comedy-drama plays